1681 Steinmetz, provisional designation , is a stony asteroid from the central region of the asteroid belt, approximately 16 kilometers in diameter. It was discovered on 23 November 1948, by French astronomer Marguerite Laugier at Nice Observatory in south-eastern France. It was named after German amateur astronomer Julius Steinmetz.

Orbit and classification 

Steinmetz orbits the Sun in the central main-belt at a distance of 2.1–3.2 AU once every 4 years and 5 months (1,617 days). Its orbit has an eccentricity of 0.20 and an inclination of 7° with respect to the ecliptic.

Physical characteristics 

This asteroid is characterized as a common S-type asteroid in the Tholen classification.

Rotation period 

In December 2006, Italian amateur astronomer Silvano Casulli obtained a rotational lightcurve of Steinmetz from photometric observations. It gave a well-defined rotation period of 8.99917 hours with a brightness variation of 0.42 magnitude.

Diameter and albedo 

According to the surveys carried out by the Japanese Akari satellite and NASA's Wide-field Infrared Survey Explorer with its subsequent NEOWISE mission, Steinmetz measures 14.58 and 16.16 kilometers in diameter, and its surface has an albedo of 0.204 and 0.161, respectively. The Collaborative Asteroid Lightcurve Link assumes an albedo of 0.10 and calculates a diameter of 20.49 kilometers based on an absolute magnitude of 11.56.

Naming 

According to a proposal by Otto Kippes, who verified the discovery, this minor planet was named after Julius Steinmetz (1893–1965), a German amateur astronomer, orbit computer, and pastor from Gerolfingen in Bavaria. The official naming citation was published by the Minor Planet Center on 1 October 1980.

References

External links 
 Asteroid Lightcurve Database (LCDB), query form (info )
 Dictionary of Minor Planet Names, Google books
 Asteroids and comets rotation curves, CdR – Observatoire de Genève, Raoul Behrend
 Discovery Circumstances: Numbered Minor Planets (1)-(5000)  – Minor Planet Center
 
 

001681
Discoveries by Marguerite Laugier
Named minor planets
001681
19481123